George Heppell (2 September 1916 – 20 July 1993) was an English football goalkeeper who made 213 league and cup appearances for Port Vale either side of World War II. His father-in-law, Albert Pearson, and great-grandson, Tom Conlon, both also played for Port Vale.

Career
Heppell joined Port Vale from Wolverhampton Wanderers in May 1937. He made 25 Third Division North appearances in the 1937–38 season, as goalkeeping duties were split between himself and James Nicholls. However, he played just three Third Division South games in the 1938–39 season, as new signing Arthur Jepson became the club's first choice goalkeeper. Heppell was enlisted into the Army in February 1940. Despite this he managed to guest for Nottingham Forest and Middlesbrough during World War II, before returning to Port Vale following his demobilization in January 1946. He was an ever-present during the 1946–47 season, as his form convinced the club to sell Jepson to rivals Stoke City. He remained Gordon Hodgson's first choice goalkeeper, playing 40 games in the 1947–48 campaign. He played 38 games in the 1948–49 season, ahead of reserves Ray Hancock and Harry Prince. However, he then lost his place, and played just three games in the 1949–50 season as new signing Ray King proved to be in impressive form. He featured 17 and 28 times in the 1950–51 and 1951–52 seasons, before being handed a free transfer away from Vale Park by new boss Freddie Steele in May 1952. He later played Cheshire County League football for Witton Albion, featuring in 18 games during the 1952–53 season.

Personal life

His father-in-law was Albert Pearson, who played for Port Vale and Liverpool from 1914 to 1922. Heppell's great-grandson, Tom Conlon signed with Port Vale in 2018.

Career statistics
Source:

References

People from Wingate, County Durham
Footballers from County Durham
English footballers
Association football goalkeepers
Wolverhampton Wanderers F.C. players
Port Vale F.C. players
Nottingham Forest F.C. wartime guest players
Middlesbrough F.C. wartime guest players
Witton Albion F.C. players
English Football League players
British Army personnel of World War II
1916 births
1993 deaths